Opuntia pachyrrhiza is a species of plant in the family Cactaceae. It is endemic to Mexico.  Its natural habitat is subtropical or tropical dry lowland grassland. It is threatened by habitat loss.

References

pachyrrhiza
Endemic flora of Mexico
Cacti of Mexico
Vulnerable plants
Taxonomy articles created by Polbot